Suzanne Webb (born 4 February 1966) is a British Conservative Party politician. She has been the Member of Parliament (MP) for Stourbridge since the  2019 general election. She was the Parliamentary Private Secretary to Prime Minister Liz Truss from September to October 2022.

Early life and career
Webb was born in Sutton Coldfield, and educated to degree level. Prior to becoming an MP, she worked for a global logistics provider for 29 years, most recently in a senior leadership role.

Early political career
Webb voted for the UK to remain in the European Union in the 2016 referendum, although she became a supporter of Brexit after the referendum.

Webb was elected as a Conservative Party councillor for the Castle Vale ward on Birmingham City Council on 3 May 2018. Her term of office expired in 2022. She had previously stood unsuccessfully as the Conservative candidate for the Sutton Vesey ward in 2016. She also stood unsuccessfully as a candidate in the 2019 European Parliament elections for the West Midlands.

As part of the Conservative voluntary party, Webb was the Coventry, Birmingham, and Solihull Area Chairman between 2017 and 2019. In 2019, Webb was elected as the West Midlands Regional Chairman. She was also part of the Andy Street Campaign Team for the 2017 West Midlands mayoral election.

In November 2019, Webb was adopted as the candidate for Stourbridge after the incumbent, Margot James, announced that she would not be contesting the forthcoming election. The seat, which had been held by the Conservatives since 2010, was held by Webb.

Parliamentary career
She was appointed Parliamentary Private Secretary in the Department for International Trade and Women and Equalities, serving under Liz Truss, in June 2020.

In September 2021, Webb was appointed Parliamentary Private Secretary to Secretary of State for Defence, Ben Wallace.

On 8 July to 7 September 2022, she was an Assistant Government Whip in a role attached to the Ministry for Defence. 

On 7 September 2022, Webb was appointed as the Parliamentary Private Secretary to the Prime Minister, Liz Truss. 

Suzanne sat on the Procedure Committee between 2019 and 2022.

In July 2022, Webb was criticised for posting a picture of herself with the Black Country flag upside down. Webb later claimed that the picture had been posted in error by her staff.

References

External links

1966 births
Living people
Conservative Party (UK) councillors
Conservative Party (UK) MPs for English constituencies
Councillors in Birmingham, West Midlands
Parliamentary Private Secretaries to the Prime Minister
Female members of the Parliament of the United Kingdom for English constituencies
People from Sutton Coldfield
UK MPs 2019–present
21st-century British women politicians
21st-century English women
21st-century English people
Women councillors in England